Lac à la Croix or Lac-à-la-Croix (French for "Lake of the Cross") can refer to the following places in Quebec, Canada:
 Lac-à-la-Croix, Quebec, an unorganized territory
 Lac à la Croix (Lac-Édouard), a lake in the Mauricie region
 Lac-à-la-Croix, a community in the city of Métabetchouan–Lac-à-la-Croix

See also
 Lac La Croix First Nation, a First Nation in Ontario, Canada
 Croix (disambiguation)
 La Croix (disambiguation)
 Cross Lake (disambiguation)